This is a list of seasons completed by the Brown Bears football team of the National Collegiate Athletic Association (NCAA) Division I Football Championship Subdivision (FCS). Since the team's first game in 1878, the Bears have contested more than 1,200 officially sanctioned games, holding an all-time record of 619–590–40. Brown competed as a football independent since its founding before joining the Ivy League in 1956.

Seasons

See also 
 List of Ivy League football standings

References 

Brown Bears

Brown Bears football seasons